The Independence Medal can refer to any one of the following medals:

 Centenary of National Independence Commemorative Medal (Belgium)
 Ceylon Armed Services Inauguration Medal
 Cross of Independence (Poland)
 Fiji Independence Medal
 Independence Medal (Bophuthatswana)
 Independence Medal (Ciskei)
 Independence Medal (Lithuania)
 Independence Medal (Transkei)
 Independence Medal (Venda)
 Indian Independence Medal
 Jamaica Independence Medal
 Malawi Independence Medal
 Medal of Independence (Turkey)
 Nigerian Independence Medal
 Pakistan Medal
 Papua New Guinea Independence Medal
 Philippine Independence Medal
 Sierra Leone Independence Medal
 Solomon Islands Independence Medal
 Uganda Independence Medal
 Union of South Africa Commemoration Medal
 Zimbabwean Independence Medal, 1980